Harold Barratt (1918 – 1989) was an English football player and manager.

Managerial career
Barratt managed Gillingham from 1958 to 1962. This was his only known managerial appointment.

References

1918 births
1989 deaths
Footballers from Oxford
English footballers
Coventry City F.C. players
Cheltenham Town F.C. players
English football managers
Gillingham F.C. managers
Association footballers not categorized by position